Novita may refer to:

 Nóvita, a municipality in Colombia
 Novita (company), a Finnish textile company
 Novita Children's Services, an Australian organisation
 Novita Dewi (born 1978), Indonesian singer
 Jo Novita (born 1980), Indonesian badminton player
 Novitas – ROYAL, an academic journal